, provisional designation: , is a Jupiter trojan from the Trojan camp, approximately  in diameter. It was discovered on 19 June 1998, by astronomers with the Lincoln Near-Earth Asteroid Research at the Lincoln Lab's ETS near Socorro, New Mexico, in the United States. The suspected tumbler is also a slow rotator with a period of 250 hours. It has not been named since its numbering in July 2000.

Orbit and classification 

 is a Jupiter trojan in a 1:1 orbital resonance with Jupiter. It is located in the trailering Trojan camp at the Gas Giant's  Lagrangian point, 60° behind its orbit .

It orbits the Sun at a distance of 4.9–5.4 AU once every 11 years and 10 months (4,309 days; semi-major axis of 5.18 AU). Its orbit has an eccentricity of 0.05 and an inclination of 17° with respect to the ecliptic. The body's observation arc begins with a precovery published by the Digitized Sky Survey and taken at Palomar Observatory in December 1953, more than 44 years prior to its official discovery observation at Socorro.

Numbering and naming 

This minor planet was numbered by the Minor Planet Center on 26 July 2000. , it has not been named.

Physical characteristics 

 is an assumed C-type asteroid. It has a typical V–I color index of 0.906 (see table below).

Rotation period 

In August 2013, Robert Stephens at the Center for Solar System Studies observed  over three nights. However no meaningful rotational lightcurve could be determined, as the lightcurve's amplitude never varied more than 0.02 magnitude. A period of 11.17 hours was only derived for demonstration purpose. In December 2015, Stephens obtained an improved lightcurve with a rotation period of  hours and a brightness variation of 0.30 magnitude. This time the asteroid was observed on 16 nights over a period of one month. The photometric observations also revealed that this object possibly has a non-principal axis rotation, which is commonly known as tumbling.

Diameter and albedo 

According to the survey carried out by the NEOWISE mission of NASA's Wide-field Infrared Survey Explorer and the Japanese Akari satellite,  measures 43.53 and 51.53 kilometers in diameter and its surface has an albedo of 0.071 and 0.046, respectively. The Collaborative Asteroid Lightcurve Link assumes a standard albedo for a carbonaceous asteroid of 0.057 and calculates a diameter of 46.30 kilometers based on an absolute magnitude of 10.4.

Notes

References

External links 
 Asteroid Lightcurve Database (LCDB), query form (info )
 Discovery Circumstances: Numbered Minor Planets (15001)-(20000) – Minor Planet Center
 Asteroid (15977) 1998 MA11 at the Small Bodies Data Ferret
 
 

015977
015977
015977
19980619